The Salvay-Stark Skyhopper I is a low-wing single-place homebuilt aircraft designed in 1944.

Development

The Skyhopper design was started in 1944 by two North American Aviation engineers from Kansas City. They had previously partnered on the Commonwealth Skyranger and worked on the B-25 program. It was engineered to the then current Civil Aeronautics Administration CAR-04 standards criteria of the time. As a light aircraft under construction during wartime, permission needed to be granted for tools and materials by the CAA.

Design
The single-seat low-wing aircraft was intended to be open cockpit, but was redesigned to have a full canopy. The fuselage is welded steel tubing. The wings use spruce wood spars and ribs with fabric covering. The controls are actuated with push/pull tubes. The stabilizers are covered with mahogany plywood. The Skyhopper I is the plans built version of the prototype introduced in 1958.

Operational history
The prototype was test flown from Fairfax Airport in Kansas City in March 1945. In 1946, The effort to produce the aircraft as a production certified aircraft under the company name Aviation Boosters Inc. was dropped, but Gene Salvay retained the rights to the aircraft where it could be built as a homebuilt aircraft.

Variants
 Skyhopper I - original version of the skyhopper. Continental 50 hp engine.
 Skyhopper II  - designed in 1962 to sit two passengers side by side via a  widening of the Skyhopper 10 fuselage design. It was built by Ralph Thenhaus of Van Nuys, California.
 A two-seat tandem modification of the Skyhopper was built using a Continental O-200 engine.
 Trefethen Sport-Aire II - A wider fuselage tricycle gear version based on Stark's Super Skyhopper jigs. Built by Stark, Art Thistle and Al Trefethen. Other changes made were a swept tail, a tapered wing, and a Lycoming O-295 engine.

Specifications (Salvay-Stark Skyhopper I)

References

External links

Photo of Skyhopper
aerofiles

Homebuilt aircraft